Peperomia is one of the two large genera of the family Piperaceae. It is estimated that there are at least over 1,000 species, occurring in all tropical and subtropical regions of the world. They are concentrated in northern South America and Central America, but are also found in Africa, southern Asia, and Oceania. The exact number is difficult to tell as some plants have been recorded several times with different names and new species continue to be discovered. Peperomias have adapted to many different environments and their appearance varies greatly. Some are epiphytes (growing on other plants) or lithophytes (growing on rock or in rock crevices), and many are xerophytes (drought-tolerant) either with thick succulent structures or with underground tubers (geophytes). Most species are compact perennial shrubs or vines.

The genus name Peperomia was coined by Spanish botanists Ruiz López and Pavón Jiménez in 1794 after their travels in Peru and Chile. Peperomia plants do not have a widely accepted common name and some argue that it is better to use the genus name, as is the case with genera such as Petunia and Begonia. They are sometimes called radiator plants, a name possibly coined by L.H. Bailey because many of them enjoy bright and dry environments similar to a windowsill above a radiator.

Description
Peperomias vary considerably in appearance (see gallery below) and there is no universally accepted method of categorising them, although three main groups can be distinguished. Most species are compact and usually do not exceed  in height. 

First are plants with decorative foliage, which often grow in rain or clouds forests as epiphytes. They are adapted to living in small shady crevices on, for example, trees, with small root systems. As they do not have access to ground water they are typically succulent to a certain degree which in many species shows as thick, fleshy leaves, which have a waxy surface and are sometimes rippled. They may be green or striped, marbled or bordered with pale green, red or gray, and the petioles of some kinds are red. They also enjoy high air humidity, warm temperatures, and grow all year round. Examples include P. argyreia, P. caperata, P. nitida, and P. obtusifolia.

Second group consists of arid climate succulent peperomias, which are often found in high altitudes. They are adapted to withstanding a long warm season followed by a colder winter and very little rainfall. They store water both in their stout stems and in their succulent leaves, which typically form kind of tubes or balls, appearing U- or V-shaped in cross-section, often with epidermal windows on the top-side. P. columella, P. ferreyrae and P. nivalis fall into this category.

The third group contains geophytic peperomias. These plants have leaves that fall off in the colder dry season, survive due to their underground tubers, and grow the leaves back as more rain falls. Examples include P. macrorhiza, P. peruviana, and P. umbilicata. Currently just under 50 species of geophytic peperomias are known, but new ones continue to be discovered.

Peperomia flowers are typically unnoticeable, growing in cordlike spikes, although there are some exceptions such as P. fraseri. Most peperomia flowers seem odorless to humans but some carry a musty or even unpleasant odor, such as P. graveolens. The fruit is a berry that eventually dries out and shows the tiny pepper-like seed.

Species

There are over a thousand Peperomia species, although the exact number is unclear as some plants have been recorded several times with different names (c. 3,000 names have been used in publications) and new species continue to be discovered. At the moment Catalogue of Life lists around 1,400 recognized species.

Distribution
Peperomias are found in tropical and sub-tropical regions around the world. Northern South America and Central America host the largest number of species, but peperomias can also be found in Africa, southern Asia, and Oceania. The exact number of peperomia species continues to change as new plants are discovered and some distinct plant names, perhaps catalogued in separate geographical regions, are realised to describe the same species. Therefore the table below gives only a rough overall impression of the worldwide distribution.

Note that many peperomias are found in wide overlapping regions, for example everywhere in tropical America or Asia, and so may have not been included in the species count for individual areas.

Peperomias and humans

Horticulture
Peperomias are often grown for their ornamental foliage and many species are considered easy to grow in homes and greenhouses. Several species have been given the Award of Garden Merit by the Royal Horticultural Society. Peperomias are largely considered non-toxic and are often recommended for households with children or animals.

Out of the 1,000+ Peperomia species, currently only about 40 of them are commonly used as houseplants. These peperomias fare well in average home conditions and can relatively easily be found in stores and garden centers. Species in this basic group include P. alata, P. albovittata, P. argyreia, P. blanda, P. boivinii, P. caperata, P. clusiifolia, P. columella, P. dolabriformis, P. ferreyrae, P. fraseri, P. glabella, P. graveolens, P. griseoargentea, P. hoffmannii, P. incana, P. japonica, P. kimnachii, P. maculosa, P. metallica, P. nitida (often sold as P. scandens), P. nivalis, P. obtusifolia, P. pellucida, P. perciliata, P. pereskiifolia, P. polybotrya, P. prostrata, P. quadrangularis (syn. P. angulata), P. rotundifolia, P. rugosa, P. tetragona (syn. P. puteolata), P. tetraphylla, P. turboensis, P. urocarpa, P. verschaffeltii, P. verticillata (syn. P. rubella), and P. wheeleri.

There can be, however, several cultivars available from each species. Identifying species can be challenging as plants are often sold under marketing names, older synonyms, or under names that have not been officially accepted. This is the case, for example, with Peperomia orba (often sold as Peperomia 'Pixie'), Peperomia viridis, and Peperomia axillaris. In addition to natural species and their cultivars, some artificial hybrid varieties can also be found on the market, such as Peperomia 'Hope' (a cross between P. deppeana and P. quadrifolia). 

Most species need airy, well-draining substrate and want to dry out to some extent or even completely between waterings. A typical reason for losing a peperomia is through root rot caused by over-watering. The tropical, decorative foliage plants, typically enjoy shadier conditions with more humidity. Some might even require a terrarium or a bottle garden to maintain high humidity. The arid climate succulent types should be treated similarly to cacti and other succulents: they can tolerate more light and will survive a dry cold period, during which they are watered only seldomly. The geophytic peperomias are used to experiencing a cold resting period once a year.

Food and medicine
Many peperomias are herbs in the sense that their leaves carry a spicy flavour and, when crushed, emit a strong odour. Because of this some species, such as Peperomia pellucida are used in salads and cooking, or to flavour drinks.  Some, including Peperomia inaequalifolia and Peperomia congona, are also used in herbal medicine as digestives, for their anti-inflammatory and wound-healing qualities, or as drops against otitis and conjunctivitis. 
While such folk medicine usage is common in Peru and elsewehere the possible medicinal qualities of peperomias remain poorly investigated, although there has been a growing interest for the subject recently. For the moment, it is advised that people should not try to eat the peperomias sold as houseplants.

Propagation
These plants can be propagated by seeds, by cuttings, or by dividing. Peperomia cuttings of many species root easily.

Plants can be divided and repotted. They are removed and separated into smaller pieces, each with a few roots attached. Leaf or stem cuttings can also be taken in the spring or summer. The lower leaves of the shoots are removed and a cut is made below the bottom node (joint). They are then laid on a bench for an hour or two to allow a protective callus tissue to form over the cuts. It is best not to seal the top completely, as the plants are semi-succulent in nature and excessive humidity is detrimental. When enough roots have formed, cuttings can be planted in  pots or in hanging baskets.

Gallery

Examples of tropical, decorative foliage types

Examples of arid climate succulent types

Examples of geophytic peperomias

See also
 List of Peperomia species
 List of Peperomia diseases

References

External links
 Internet Peperomia Reference by botanist Guido Mathieu
 Examples of geophytic Peperomias

 
Epiphytes
House plants
Piperales genera
Tropical flora
Pantropical flora